Lycée Maximilien Sorre (LMS) is a sixth-form college/senior high school in Cachan, Val de Marne, France, in the Paris metropolitan area.

References

External links
 Lycée Maximilien Sorre 

Lycées in Val-de-Marne